Between Time and Eternity is a 1956 West German-Spanish drama film directed by Arthur Maria Rabenalt and starring Lilli Palmer, Willy Birgel and Carlos Thompson. It was co-produced with Spain as part of a growing trend in European production.

The film's sets were designed by the art directors Albrecht Becker and Herbert Kirchhoff. It was shot in Eastmancolor.

Cast

References

External links

1956 romantic drama films
German romantic drama films
West German films
Spanish romantic drama films
Films directed by Arthur Maria Rabenalt
Films about diseases
1950s German films
1950s German-language films